Manuel Rodríguez Vega (born 16 January 1944) is a Chilean former footballer and manager.

Coaching career
In addition to coach various clubs in the Chilean football, at the beginning Rodríguez Vega worked in the Universidad de Chile youth ranks, where he trained players such as Marcelo Salas, Rodrigo Goldberg and Esteban Valencia.

In the 1990s and 2000s, he lived and worked as coach in Indonesia, country where he came thanks to his brother Juan and coached clubs such as Persita Tangerang. After returning to Chile, he coached clubs at minor categories such as  Provincial Osorno, Ferroviarios and Municipal Salamanca. Previuously, he coached for a short term the Chile women's national team.

Personal life
His brothers Juan and Gabriel were professional footballers. Juan was part of the Chilean 1974 World Cup squad and Gabriel played for Colo-Colo and Deportes Concepción.

His nephews, Juan and Francisco Rodríguez Rubio, sons of his brother Juan, were also professional footballers who made his career mainly in Indonesia.

Honours

Club
Universidad de Chile
 Campeonato Nacional (4): 1962, 1965, 1967, 1969
  (2): 1968, 1969
  (1):

References

External links
 Manuel Rodríguez Vega at PlaymakerStats
 

Living people
1944 births
Footballers from Santiago
Chilean footballers
Chilean expatriate footballers
Universidad de Chile footballers
San Luis de Quillota footballers
Los Angeles Aztecs players
Chilean Primera División players
North American Soccer League (1968–1984) players
Chilean expatriate sportspeople in the United States
Expatriate soccer players in the United States
Association football midfielders
Chilean football managers
Chilean expatriate football managers
Ñublense managers
Universidad de Chile managers
Deportes Iquique managers
Arturo Fernández Vial managers
Deportes Melipilla managers
Provincial Osorno managers
Persita Tangerang managers
Chilean Primera División managers
Primera B de Chile managers
Liga 1 (Indonesia) managers
Women's association football managers
Chile women's national football team managers
Chilean expatriate sportspeople in Indonesia
Expatriate football managers in Indonesia
Magallanes managers